Percy Wilson Phillips (June 2, 1892 – May 15, 1969) was a judge of the United States Board of Tax Appeals (later the United States Tax Court) from 1924 to 1931.

Early life, education, and military service
Born in Southampton, New York, Phillips attended Southampton High School and received his law degree from Cornell Law School in 1915. He served in the United States Army during World War I, achieving the rank of first lieutenant of field artillary, and after the war receiving a promotion to captain of field artillery. He then joined the law firm of Sackett, Chapman, Brown and Cross, in Manhattan, specializing in income tax and inheritance tax matters.

Board of Tax Appeals and later life
In March 1925, Phillips was appointed to the Board by President Calvin Coolidge. A 1925 report of his early activities with the board read as follows:

Phillips was reappointed for a 10-year term in June 1926, but resigned in 1931 to form a new law firm with fellow board member James S.Y. Ivins and tax lawyer Richard Barker, called Ivins Phillips Barker. He remained in practice for decades thereafter, and in 1956 successfully represented  the H. J. Heinz Co. in a suit to recover tax overpayments from the mid 1940s.

Personal life and death
On August 15, 1920, Phillips married Margaret Richards Terrell, a nurse, of Riverhead, New York, with whom he had three daughters and a son. He died in Washington, D.C., at the age of 76, and was buried in Arlington National Cemetery.

References

1892 births
1969 deaths
People from Southampton (town), New York
Cornell Law School alumni
United States Army personnel of World War I
Members of the United States Board of Tax Appeals
United States Article I federal judges appointed by Calvin Coolidge